Mariya Markina is a Russian model and a recipient of the 2014 Miss-MES of Russia Award.

Biography
Markina was born in Blagoveshchensk. At the age of 5 she joined choreography class and later participated in the Confetti assembly. When she was in 9th grade she joined MES program and in 2013 finished middle school. When the time came to choose where to apply after school, she and her parents chose Academy of Ministry of Emergency Situations in Khimki. There, Markina chose a class in advertisement and social integration and succeed in it. Prior to winning Miss-MES of Russia Award at the age of 19 on October 26, 2014, she was a winner of Beauty and Pride of Academy award which was a standard at the academy.

References

20th-century births
Living people
Russian female models
Year of birth missing (living people)